Barracks are buildings built to house military personnel or laborers.

Barrack may also refer to:

People 
 Romana Barrack (1928–2016), English television writer
 Thomas J. Barrack Jr. (born 1947), American real estate investor

Other uses
Hay barrack, an open structure for storing loose hay
 Jack M. Barrack Hebrew Academy, a school in Pennsylvania, U.S.
 Barrack (video game), by Ambrosia Software

See also

Barracking (disambiguation)
Barack (disambiguation)
Barak (disambiguation)
Baraq (disambiguation)